The Tavern Knight is a 1904 historical adventure novel written by the British-Italian writer Rafael Sabatini. It is set during the English Civil Wars.

Film adaptation
In 1920, it was turned into a film, The Tavern Knight, directed by Maurice Elvey made by Britain's largest studio of the silent era, Stoll Pictures. A proposed silent version by Warner Brothers was to star John Barrymore in 1927 but instead the Manon Lescaut story was substituted under the title When a Man Loves.

References

Bibliography
 Goble, Alan. The Complete Index to Literary Sources in Film. Walter de Gruyter, 1999.

1904 British novels
British historical novels
British adventure novels
Novels set in the 17th century
Novels set during the English Civil War
Novels set in England
Novels by Rafael Sabatini
British novels adapted into films